Dan Costa is an American journalist. He is the editor-in-chief of PC Magazine and the SVP of Content for Ziff Davis, which includes Geek.com, Extreme.com and ComputerShopper.com.

Biography 
He works in PC Labs surrounded by incredibly smart editors and unbelievably cool products. Although primarily a writer, he also tweets, photographs, broadcasts (NBC, CNBC, CNN, Fox), presents, consults, and cooks.

Speaker and author 
Dan makes frequent appearances on local, national, and international news programs, including CNN, MSNBC, FOX, ABC, NBC, and Al Jazeera America where he shares his perspective on a variety of technology trends. He also speaks at a number of private events for Fortune 500 clients. Dan does a weekly segment on iHeart Media's Rover's Morning Glory called Tech Tuesday.

He has edited two books: The Home Office Computing Handbook (McGraw-Hill, 1994) and In the Shadow of the Towers (iUniverse, 2002).

References 

American male journalists
American magazine editors
Place of birth missing (living people)
Year of birth missing (living people)
Living people